Mumbai Mirror is a 2013 Indian Hindi action film directed by Ankush Bhatt starring Sachiin J Joshi, Prakash Raj, Gihana Khan, Vimala Raman, Aditya Pancholi and Mahesh Manjrekar. It is a crime thriller which shows conflict between powerful, corrupt dance bar owners and the Mumbai police. Mumbai Mirror was released on 18 January 2013.

Plot

Cast
 Sachiin J Joshi as Abhijeet Patil
 Prakash Raj as Shetty
 Gihana Khan as Rani
 Vimala Raman as Jia
 Mahesh Manjrekar as ACP Gaitonde
 Aditya Pancholi as Durrani
 Prashant Narayanan as Manish

Production

Casting
Sachiin J Joshi plays a "quirky cop". Mallika Sherawat who agreed to play the lead opposite Sachiin J Joshi, walked out of the project despite being paid to act in the film. Gihana Khan was chosen as female lead.

Soundtrack
The soundtrack of Mumbai Mirror is composed by Amjad Nadeem and the album contains six tracks. In a music review, a critic wrote that "Amajad-Nadeem make a good attempt with Marjawa though rest of the album leaves a lot to be desired".

Reception 
Critic Taran Adarsh of Bollywood Hungama wrote that "On the whole, MUMBAI MIRROR is for those who relish masala movies. Especially for the single screen circuit". A critic from Rediff.com wrote that "This is a terrible mishap of a film that doesn't hold a mirror to society, or the city, but rather stares at it with bloodshot eyes and a dagger in hand". A critic from The Times of India wrote that "Ankush Bhatt’s slick flick grittily exposes the nexus between seedy cops and sleazy bars barons, albeit with a lot of Dabangg-isms". A critic from Koimoi wrote that "Mumbai Mirror is a terrible mistake. If you want to laugh at the utter nonsense going on on-screen, you might as well sit through it".

References